Since the creation of the London Passenger Transport Board in 1933, non-mainline railway and road passenger transport in London and the surrounding area has been under central or local government control in a variety of forms. The following persons headed the public transport authorities responsible for managing these services.

London Passenger Transport Board
Chairmen of London Passenger Transport Board:
Lord Ashfield, 1933–1947
Lord Latham, 1947

London Transport Executive
Chairmen of London Transport Executive:
Lord Latham, 1948–1953
Sir John Elliot, 1953–1959
Sir Alexander Valentine, 1959–1963

London Transport Board
Chairmen of London Transport Board:
Sir Alexander Valentine, 1963–1965
Sir Maurice Holmes, 1965–1969

London Transport Executive
Chairmen of London Transport Executive:
Sir Richard Way, 1970–1975
Sir Kenneth Robinson, 1975–1978
Ralph Bennett, 1978–1980
Sir Peter Masefield, 1980–1982
Sir Keith Bright, 1982–1984

London Regional Transport
Chairmen of London Regional Transport:
Sir Keith Bright, 1984–1988
Sir Neil Shields, 1988–1989
Sir Wilfrid Newton, 1989–1994
Peter Ford, 1994–1998
Sir Malcolm Bates, 1999–2001
Bob Kiley, 2001
Sir Malcolm Bates, 2001–2003

Transport for London
Commissioners of Transport for London:
Bob Kiley, 2000–2006
Sir Peter Hendy, 2006–2015
Mike Brown, 2015–2020
Andy Byford, 2020–2022

See also
History of public transport authorities in London
Transport in London

References

History of transport in London
 
British public transport executives